Edmund Pegge (born 1 April 1939) is an Australian actor, who has worked in both Australia and the United Kingdom.

Arriving in Adelaide as a teenager, Pegge completed his education at St Peter's College before graduating from the National Institute of Dramatic Art. Joining the exodus of Australian actors to London in the mid-sixties, he has since divided his time between the two countries, to work and visit family.

His television credits include: Division 4, Matlock Police, Moonbase 3, Doctor Who (in the serial The Invisible Enemy), Secret Army, Return of the Saint, Codename Icarus, Bird of Prey, Tenko, It Ain't Half Hot Mum, The Day of the Triffids, One by One, The Winds of War, Anzacs, Howards' Way, Doctors, Rosemary & Thyme and Home Sweet Home. Pegge appears in the first two volumes of The Phoenix Files audio dramas as Robert Montag.

Forever Horatio: An Actor's Life, an autobiography written by the actor and featuring a foreword by Judi Dench, was published in 2017 by Wakefield Press.

References

External links
 
 Edmund Pegge at Theatricalia
 
 Official Website

Living people
Australian male television actors
British male television actors
1939 births
National Institute of Dramatic Art alumni